Jay Patrick Lynch (January 7, 1945 – March 5, 2017) was an American cartoonist who played a key role in the underground comix movement with his Bijou Funnies and other titles. He is best known for his comic strip Nard n' Pat and the running gag Um tut sut. His work is sometimes signed Jayzey Lynch. Lynch was the main writer for Bazooka Joe comics from 1967 to 1990; he contributed to Mad, and in the 2000s expanded into the children's book field.

Biography 
Lynch was born in Orange, New Jersey, and grew up in Belmar, New Jersey, later moving to Florida.

At age 17, Lynch moved to Chicago in 1963, where he attended art school at night and worked a string of odd jobs, including running a service bar for the improv comedy troupe Second City.

Comix 
Lynch's first published cartoons were for the Roosevelt University humor magazine, the Aardvark; he also contributed to a wide range of college humor publications. Lynch soon graduated to professional humor magazines like Sick, Cracked, and The Realist; and when the underground press movement started in the mid-1960s he became a regular contributor to papers like the Chicago Seed, and (thanks to the  Underground Press Syndicate) the Berkeley Barb, the East Village Other, Fifth Estate, and others. Beginning in 1967, Lynch became the lead writer for the Bazooka Joe comics, a gig he kept until 1990.

In 1967, Lynch teamed up with fellow Chicago transplant Skip Williamson to publish the underground newspaper The Chicago Mirror, which in 1968 after three issues was renamed and reformatted into the underground comix anthology Bijou Funnies. As Ben Schwartz writes, Bijou Funnies "... would become Chicago's answer to Robert Crumb's Zap Comix, ... with early work by Lynch, Spiegelman, Gilbert Shelton and Skip Williamson." Bijou Funnies was heavily influenced by Mad magazine, and, along with Zap, is considered one of the titles to launch the underground comix movement. Bijou Funnies lasted 8 issues (from 1968 to 1973); a selection of stories from Bijou Funnies were collected in 1975 in the book The Best of Bijou Funnies (Quick Fox/Links Books).

Lynch's best known comic book stories involve  the human-cat duo Nard n' Pat, recurring characters in Bijou Funnies. Nard is a bald middle-aged man of conservative tendencies, and Patrick is his more "hip" talking cat. Nard n' Pat were featured in two issues of their own comic, the first one published by Cartoonists Co-Op Press in 1974 (Cartoonists Co-Op Press was a self-publishing venture by Lynch, Kim Deitch, Bill Griffith, Jerry Lane, Willy Murphy, Diane Noomin, and Art Spiegelman that operated in 1973–1974), and the second issue published by Kitchen Sink Press in 1981.

The weekly comic strip Phoebe and the Pigeon People, by Lynch and illustrator Gary Whitney, ran in the Chicago Reader for 17 years in the late 1970s and 1980s; Kitchen Sink Press published 3 issues of a Phoebe & the Pigeon People comic book collecting material from the strip in 1979–1981. Up until his death, Lynch had scans of more than 500 editions of the strip ready for any publisher who saw the potential of a Phoebe and the Pigeon People book.

Trading cards 
Beginning in 1968, Lynch became a major contributor to Topps' Wacky Packages and Garbage Pail Kids, plus other Topps humor products. In 2002, he recalled his creative working methods and procedures with Len Brown and others at the Topps' Product Development Department:

Mad, children's books, Mineshaft, and other work 

During the 1990s, he began writing for Mad, and he also devised products for Mad merchandising.

Lynch and his wife Carol collaborated in the early 2000s on a series of fine art paintings, selling them under the joint pseudonym "Kringo."

Lynch wrote two children's books for Toon Books in 2008–2009: Otto's Orange Day, illustrated by Frank Cammuso,  and Mo and Jo Fighting Together Forever, illustrated by Dean Haspiel.

Jay Lynch was a regular contributor to Mineshaft magazine from 2006 to 2018 with his work appearing in issues 18, 19, 20, 21, 22, 23 (front cover), 24, 25, 30, 31 (front cover), 32, 33, and Mineshaft #35, with front cover art by Robert Crumb, which was the "Jay Lynch Memorial Issue".

Personal life and death 
Lynch's first wife Jane Lynch was an occasional contributor to comics in the early 1970s, including pieces she wrote for Arcade #3 (an interview with Bill Griffith's character Zippy the Pinhead) and Skywald Publications's Psycho #17 (a story called "The Lunatic Class Of '64," illustrated by Emilio Bernardo). Lynch and his second wife, Carol, were married for twenty years.

Lynch died from complications of lung cancer on March 5, 2017, in Candor, New York.

Awards
In June 2009, Jay Lynch was nominated for a Harvey Award in the category of "Best Cover Artist" for his Mineshaft #23 cover.

Bibliography

Underground comix 
Solo series and as editor:
 Bijou Funnies #1–8 (Bijou Publishing Empire, Print Mint, Kitchen Sink, 1968–1973) — editor, contributor
 Don Dohler's ProJunior (Kitchen Sink, Oct. 1971) —  editor, contributor
 Turned on Cuties (Golden Gate Publishing Company, 1972) — editor, contributor
 Roxy Funnies (Head Imports, 1972) — editor, contributor
 Purple Cat (Adam's Apple Distributing, 1973) — editor, contributor
 Nard n' Pat #1-2 (Cartoonists Co-Op Press, 1974; Kitchen Sink, 1981) — Lynch solo series
 Phoebe & the Pigeon People #1–3 (Kitchen Sink, 1979–1981) — collection of material from Phoebe and the Pigeon People strip with Gary Whitney (17-year run in the Chicago Reader)

As contributor:
 Gothic Blimp Works #1–2 (1969)
 Radical America Komiks (Radical America, Jan. 1969)
 Bogeyman #2 (San Francisco Comic Book Company, 1969)
 Bogeyman #3 (Company & Sons, 1970)

Children's books
As writer:
 Otto's Orange Day (Toon Books, 2008) — illustrated by Frank Cammuso
 Mo and Jo (Toon Books, 2009) — illustrated by Dean Haspiel

Further reading 
 "Jay Lynch and the Free Exploration of Ideas: An Interview," The Comics Journal #114 (February 1987).
 Ink & Anguish: A Jay Lynch Anthology: Fantagraphics Books, 2018;

References

External links

Lambiek Comiclopedia article about Jay Lynch
 Jay Lynch on Ning
 Mineshaft: Jay Lynch
 Jay Lynch interview (raw audio) for Underdog Zine, c. 1994
 Wacky Packages (Harry N. Abrams, 2008)
 Greg Grant's Wacky Packages site
 Jay Lynch 30-minute interview on The Nick Digilio Show, June 27, 2004.
 NPR interview, "Gagging on Products": Jay Lynch (June 10, 2008)

1945 births
2017 deaths
Alternative cartoonists
American children's writers
American comic strip cartoonists
American comics writers
American graphic novelists
American humorists
American satirists
Mad (magazine) cartoonists
People from Belmar, New Jersey
People from Orange, New Jersey
Novelists from New Jersey
Underground cartoonists
American male novelists
Deaths from lung cancer in New York (state)
American male non-fiction writers